The 1953 Detroit Tigers season was a season in American baseball. The team finished sixth in the American League with a record of 60–94, 40½ games behind the New York Yankees.

Offseason
 October 27, 1952: Neil Berry, Cliff Mapes and $25,000 were traded by the Tigers to the St. Louis Browns for Jake Crawford.
 December 4, 1952: Johnny Groth, Virgil Trucks and Hal White were traded by the Tigers to the St. Louis Browns for Jay Porter, Owen Friend and Bob Nieman.
 Prior to 1953 season: Bob Shaw was signed as an amateur free agent by the Tigers.

Regular season

Season standings

Record vs. opponents

Notable transactions 
 June 15, 1953: Art Houtteman, Owen Friend, Bill Wight, and Joe Ginsberg were traded by the Tigers to the Cleveland Indians for Ray Boone, Al Aber, Steve Gromek, and Dick Weik.
 July 27, 1953: Hal Newhouser was released by the Tigers.

Roster

Player stats

Batting

Starters by position 
Note: Pos = Position; G = Games played; AB = At bats; H = Hits; Avg. = Batting average; HR = Home runs; RBI = Runs batted in

Other batters 
Note: G = Games played; AB = At bats; H = Hits; Avg. = Batting average; HR = Home runs; RBI = Runs batted in

Pitching

Starting pitchers 
Note: G = Games pitched; IP = Innings pitched; W = Wins; L = Losses; ERA = Earned run average; SO = Strikeouts

Other pitchers 
Note: G = Games pitched; IP = Innings pitched; W = Wins; L = Losses; ERA = Earned run average; SO = Strikeouts

Relief pitchers 
Note: G = Games pitched; W = Wins; L = Losses; SV = Saves; ERA = Earned run average; SO = Strikeouts

Farm system 

LEAGUE CHAMPIONS: Jamestown

Notes

References 

1953 Detroit Tigers season at Baseball Reference

Detroit Tigers seasons
Detroit Tigers season
Detroit Tigers
1953 in Detroit